The Ethiopian Empire,  also formerly known by the exonym Abyssinia, or just simply known as Ethiopia (Amharic and Tigrinya:  , , Oromo: , Somali: ,), was an empire that historically spanned the geographical area of present-day Ethiopia and Eritrea from the establishment of the Solomonic dynasty by Yekuno Amlak approximately in 1270 until the 1974 coup d'etat of Emperor Haile Selassie by the Derg. By 1896, the Empire incorporated other regions such as Hararghe, Gurage and Wolayita, and saw its largest expansion with the federation of Eritrea in 1952. Throughout much of its existence, it was surrounded by hostile forces in the African Horn; however, it managed to develop and preserve a kingdom based on its ancient form of Christianity.

Founded in 1270 by the Solomonic dynasty nobleman Yekuno Amlak, who claimed to descend from the last Aksumite king and ultimately the Biblical Menelik I and the Queen of Sheba, it replaced the Agaw kingdom of the Zagwe. While initially a rather small and politically unstable entity, the Empire managed to expand significantly under the crusades of Amda Seyon I (1314–1344) and Yeshaq I (1414–1429), temporarily becoming the dominant force of the African Horn. Yeshaq's reign was however challenged by Sultan Jamal ad-Din II which led to Yeshaq's death. Under the rule of Zara Yaqob (1434–1468), the Hadiya Sultanate was invaded by Ethiopia and the captured Hadiya princess Eleni converted to Christianity leading to her marriage to Zara Yacob. Muslims in the region as well as Adal Sultanate rejected the marriage alliance and repeatedly invaded Ethiopia, finally succeeding under Imam Mahfuz. Mahfuz's ambush and defeat by Emperor Lebna Dengel brought about the early 16th-century Jihad of the Adalite Imam Ahmed Gran, who was only defeated in 1543 with the help of the Portuguese. Greatly weakened, much of the Empire's southern territory and vassals were lost due to the Oromo migrations. In the north, in what is now Eritrea, Ethiopia managed to repulse Ottoman invasion attempts, although losing its access to the Red Sea to them.

Reacting to these challenges, in the 1630s Emperor Fasilides founded the new capital of Gondar, marking the start of a new golden age known as the Gondarine period. It saw relative peace, the successful integration of the Oromo and a flourishing of culture. With the deaths of Emperor Iyasu II (1755) and Iyoas I (1769) the realm eventually entered a period of decentralization, known as the "Era of the Princes". Regional warlords fought for power, with the emperor being a mere puppet.

Emperor Tewodros II (r. 1855–1868) put an end to that state, reunified the Empire and led it into the modern period before dying during the British Expedition to Abyssinia. His successor Yohannes IV engaged primarily in war and successfully fought the Egyptians and Mahdists before dying against the latter in 1889. Emperor Menelik II, now residing in Addis Ababa, subjugated many peoples and kingdoms in what is now western, southern, and eastern Ethiopia, like Kaffa, Welayta, Aussa, and the Oromos. Thus, by 1898 Ethiopia expanded into its modern territorial boundaries. In the north, he was confronted with an expanding Italy. Decisively defeating it at the Battle of Adwa in 1896 using imported modern weapons, Menelik ensured Ethiopia's independence and confined Italy to Eritrea.

Later, after the Second Italo-Ethiopian War, Benito Mussolini's Italian Empire occupied Ethiopia and established the Italian East Africa, merging it with neighboring Eritrea and Italian Somaliland colony to the south-east. After World War II, the Italians were driven out of Ethiopia with the help of the British army. The Emperor returned from exile and the country was one of the founding members of the United Nations, and in 1962 annexed Eritrea. However, the 1973 Wollo famine and domestic discontent led to the fall of the Empire in 1974.

By 1974, Ethiopia was one of only three countries in the world to have the title of emperor for its head of state, together with Japan and Iran. It was the second-to-last country in Africa to use the title of emperor, as after it came the short-lived Central African Empire, which lasted between 1976 and 1979 under Emperor Bokassa I.

History

Background

D'mt and Aksum

Human occupation in Ethiopia began early, as evidenced by the findings. According to the Kebra Nagast, Menelik I founded the Ethiopian empire in the 10thcentury BC. In the 4thcentury, under King Ezana of Axum, the kingdom adopted Christianity as the state religion that evolved into the Orthodox Tewahedo (Ethiopian Orthodox and Eritrean Orthodox) denominational Church. It was thus one of the first Christian states.

After the conquest of Aksum by Queen Gudit (or Yodit), a period began which some scholars refer to as the Ethiopian Dark Ages. According to Ethiopian tradition, she ruled over the remains of the Aksumite Empire for 40 years before transmitting the crown to her descendants. Gudit's origin has been extensively debated. Scholars debate whether she was a Jew, an Agaw, a Beja, or an enslaved servant of an Aksumite emperor who wanted to lead pagans against Christianity. Others argued that she was from the Sultanate of Shewa and a daughter of the king of Lasta, situated in Bugna. The Italian scholar Carlo Conti Rossini described her as a Bani al-Hamwiyah, while another source pointed to the Sidama people in the area called Sasu, probably south of the Blue Nile, where Aksumite rulers also obtained caravans for commodities of gold and coin, which are thought the main motive for Gudit's raid.

Makhzumi and Zagwe dynasties

The earliest Muslim state in Ethiopia, the Makhzumi dynasty with its capital in Wahal, Hararghe region succeeds Queen Yodit. The Zagwe kingdom, another dynasty with its capital at Adafa, emerged not far from modern day Lalibela in the Lasta mountains. The Zagwe continued the Orthodox Christianity of Aksum and constructed many rock-hewn churches such as the Church of Saint George in Lalibela. The dynasty would last until its overthrow by a new regime claiming descent from the old Aksumite kings.

Solomonic dynasty and Ifat Sultanate

An unholy alliance between Muslim and Christian states had occurred in this period. In 1270, the Zagwe dynasty was overthrown by a rebel named Yekuno Amlak claiming lineage from the Aksumite kings and, hence, from Solomon. Yekuno Amlak successfully received massive aid from the Muslim Sultanate of Shewa against Zagwe. The eponymously named Solomonic dynasty was founded and ruled by the Abyssinians, from whom Abyssinia gets its name. In 1279 the deposed Sultan of Shewa Dil Marrah successfully appealed to Yekuno Amlak to restore his rule, however it wouldn't last long, because its renegade province Ifat would eventually invade it and create the Ifat Sultanate. During the Ifat Sultanate, Muslim relations with the Solomonic dynasty soured. In the 14th century Emperor Amda Seyon would invade Ifat and essentially dismantle it as a regional power. Ifat's descendants would return to the Horn of Africa and launch a powerful regional state, the Adal Sultanate.

Adal Sultanate invasion

In 1529, the Adal Sultanate's forces led by Ahmad ibn Ibrahim al-Ghazi invaded the Ethiopian Empire in what is known as the Ethiopian–Adal war. The Adal occupation lasted fourteen years. During the conflict, the Adal Sultanate employed cannons provided by the Ottoman Empire. In the aftermath of the war, Adal annexed Ethiopia, uniting it with territories in what is now Somalia. In 1543, with the help of the Portuguese Empire, the Solomonic dynasty was restored.

Early modern period

In 1543, Emperor Gelawdewos beat Ahmad ibn Ibrahim al-Ghazi armies and Ahmad himself was killed at the Battle of Wayna Daga, close to Wegera. This victory allowed the empire to reconquer progressively the Ethiopian Highlands. In 1559 Gelawdewos was killed attempting to invade Adal Sultanate at the Battle of Fatagar, and his severed head was paraded in Adal's capital Harar.

The Ottoman Empire made another attempt at conquering Ethiopia, from 1557, establishing Habesh Eyalet, the province of Abyssinia, by conquering Massawa, the Empire's main port and seizing Suakin from the allied Funj Sultanate in what is now Sudan. In 1573 Sultanate of Harar attempted to invade Ethiopia again however Sarsa Dengel successfully defended the Ethiopian frontier.

The Ottomans were checked by Emperor Sarsa Dengel's victory and sacking of Arqiqo in 1589, thus containing them on a narrow coastline strip. The Afar Sultanate maintained the remaining Ethiopian port on the Red Sea, at Baylul.

Oromo migrations through the same period, occurred with the movement of a large pastoral population from the southeastern provinces of the Empire. A contemporary account was recorded by the monk Abba Bahrey, from the Gamo region. Subsequently, the empire organization changed progressively, with faraway provinces taking more independence. A remote province such as Bale is last recorded paying tribute to the imperial throne during Yaqob reign (1590-1607).

The reign of Iyasu the Great (1682-1706) was a major period of consolidation. It also saw the dispatching of embassies to Louis XIV's France and to Dutch India. The Early Modern period was one of intense cultural and artistic creation. Notable philosophers from that area are Zera Yacob and Walda Heywat. The city of Gondar became the capital in 1636, with several fortified castles built in the town and in its surrounding areas. After the death of Iyasu I the empire fell into a period of political turmoil.

Zemene Mesafint

From 1769 to 1855, the Ethiopian empire passed through a period known as the Princes Era (in Amharic: Zemene Mesafint). This was a period of Ethiopian history with numerous conflicts between the various Ras (equivalent to the English dukes) and the Emperor, who had only limited power and only dominated the area around the contemporary capital of Gondar. Both the development of society and culture stagnated in this period. Religious conflict, both within the Ethiopian Orthodox Church and between them and the Muslims were often used as a pretext for mutual strife. The Princes Era ended with the reign of Emperor Tewodros II.

Modern era
In 1868, following the imprisonment of several missionaries and representatives of the British government, the British engaged in the punitive Expedition to Abyssinia against Emperor Tewodros. With the backing of most nobles in Ethiopia, the campaign was a success for Britain and the Ethiopian Emperor committed suicide rather then surrender.

From 1874 to 1876, the Empire expanded into Eritrea, under Yohannes IV King of Tembien, whose forces led by Ras Alula won the Ethiopian-Egyptian War, decisively beating the Egyptian forces at the Battle of Gundet, in Hamasien. In 1887 Menelik king of Shewa invaded the Emirate of Harar after his victory at the Battle of Chelenqo.

The 1880s were marked by the Scramble for Africa. Italy, seeking a colonial presence in Africa, was awarded Eritrea by Britain which led to the Italo-Ethiopian War of 1887–1889 and the scramble for Eritrea's coastal regions between King Yohannes IV of Tembien and Italy. After the death of Emperor Yohannes IV, Italy signed a treaty with Shewa (an autonomous kingdom within the empire), creating the protectorate of Abyssinia.

Due to significant differences between the Italian and Amharic translations of the treaty, Italy believed they had subsumed Ethiopia as a protectorate, while Menelik II of Shewa repudiated the protectorate status in 1893. Insulted, Italy declared war on Ethiopia in 1895. The First Italo-Ethiopian War resulted in the 1896 Battle of Adwa, in which Italy was decisively defeated, as the Ethiopians were numerically superior, better equipped and supported by Russia and France. As a result, the Treaty of Addis Ababa was signed in October, which strictly delineated the borders of Eritrea and forced Italy to recognize the independence of Ethiopia.

Beginning in the 1890s, under the reign of the Emperor Menelik II, the empire's forces set off from the central province of Shewa to incorporate through conquest inhabited lands to the west, east and south of its realm. The territories that were annexed included those of the western Oromo (non-Shoan Oromo), Sidama, Gurage, Wolayta, and Dizi. Among the imperial troops was Ras Gobena's Shewan Oromo militia. Many of the lands that they annexed had never been under the empire's rule, with the newly incorporated territories resulting in the modern borders of Ethiopia.

Delegations from the United Kingdom and FranceEuropean powers whose colonial possessions lay next to Ethiopiasoon arrived in the Ethiopian capital to negotiate their own treaties with this newly-proven power.

Italian invasion and World War II

In 1935 Italian soldiers, commanded by Marshal Emilio De Bono, invaded Ethiopia in what is known as the Second Italo-Ethiopian War. The war lasted seven months before an Italian victory was declared. The Ethiopian Empire was incorporated into the Italian colony of Italian East Africa. The invasion was condemned by the League of Nations, though not much was done to end the hostility.

During the conflict, both Ethiopian and Italian troops committed war crimes. Ethiopian troops are known to have made use of Dum-Dum bullets (in violation of the Hague Conventions) and mutilated captured soldiers (often with castration). Italian troops used sulfur mustard in chemical warfare, ignoring the Geneva Protocol that it had signed seven years earlier. The Italian military dropped mustard gas in bombs, sprayed it from airplanes and spread it in powdered form on the ground. 150,000 chemical casualties were reported, mostly from mustard gas. In the aftermath of the war Italy annexed Ethiopia, uniting it with Italy's other colonies in eastern Africa to form the new colony of Italian East Africa, and Victor Emmanuel III of Italy adopted the title "Emperor of Abyssinia".

On 10 June 1940, Italy declared war on the United Kingdom and France, as France was in the process of being conquered by Nazi Germany at the time and Benito Mussolini wished to expand Italy's colonial holdings. The Italian conquest of British Somaliland in August 1940 was successful, but the war turned against Italy afterward. Haile Selassie returned to Ethiopia from England to help rally the resistance. The British began their own invasion in January 1941 with the help of Ethiopian freedom fighters, and the last organized Italian resistance in Italian East Africa surrendered in November 1941, ending Italian rule.

Annexation of Eritrea
At the request of Emperor Haile Selassie and the auspices of the newly formed United Nations led by Britain and the United States, the British Military Administration in Eritrea was federated with Ethiopia in 1952 by UN Resolution 390 (A). After fierce resistance, and the start of an armed rebellion in Eritrea, the Emperor decided to end the federation in 1962 and annexed Eritrea into a province of Ethiopia. The Eritrean war for independence caused a string of events that led to the end of the empire in 1974 and the toppling of the Derg government in 1991, resulting in the independence of Eritrea by the Eritrean People's Liberation Front.

Fall of monarchy

The government's failure to adequately respond to the 1973 Wollo famine, the growing discontent of urban interest groups, and high fuel prices due to the 1973 oil crisis led to a revolt in February 1974 by the army and civilian populace. In June, a group of military officers formed the Coordinating Committee of the Armed Forces, Police, and Territorial Army also known as the Derg to maintain law and order due to the powerlessness of the civilian government following the widespread mutiny.

In July, Emperor Haile Selassie gave the Derg key concessions to arrest military and government officials at every level. Soon both former Prime Ministers Tsehafi Taezaz Aklilu Habte-Wold and Endelkachew Makonnen, along with most of their cabinets, most regional governors, many senior military officers and officials of the Imperial court were imprisoned. In August, after a proposed constitution creating a constitutional monarchy was presented to the Emperor, the Derg began a program of dismantling the imperial government to forestall further developments in that direction. The Derg deposed and imprisoned the Emperor on 12 September 1974 and chose Lieutenant General Aman Andom, a popular military leader and a Sandhurst graduate, to be acting head of state. This was pending the return of Crown Prince Asfaw Wossen from medical treatment in Europe when he would assume the throne as a constitutional monarch. However, General Aman Andom quarrelled with the radical elements in the Derg over the issue of a new military offensive in Eritrea and their proposal to execute the high officials of Selassie's former government. After eliminating units loyal to him: the Engineers, the Imperial Bodyguard and the Air Force, the Derg removed General Aman from power and executed him on 23 November 1974, along with some of his supporters and 60 officials of the previous Imperial government.

Brigadier General Tafari Benti became the new chairman of the Derg and the head of state. The monarchy was formally abolished in March 1975, and Marxism-Leninism was proclaimed the new ideology of the state. Emperor Haile Selassie died under mysterious circumstances on 27 August 1975 while his personal physician was absent. It is commonly believed that Mengistu Haile Mariam killed him, either by ordering it done or by his own hand although the former is more possible.

Society
According to Bahrey, there were ten social groups in the feudal Ethiopia of his time, i.e. at the end of the 16th century. These social groups consisted of the monks; the debtera; lay officials (including judges); men at arms giving personal protection to the wives of dignitaries and to princesses; the shimaglle, who were the lords and hereditary landowners; their farm labourers or serfs; traders; artisans; wandering singers; and the soldiers, who were called chewa. According to modern thinking, some of these categories are not true classes. But at least the shimaglle, the serfs, the chewa, the artisans and the traders constitute definite classes. Power was vested in the Emperor and those aristocrats he appointed to execute his power, and the power enforcing instrument consisted of a class of soldiers, the chewa.

Military

From the reign of Amde Tseyon, Chewa regiments, or legions, formed the backbone of the Empire military forces. The Ge’ez term for these regiments is ṣewa (ጼዋ) while the Amharic term is č̣äwa (ጨዋ). The normal size of a regiment was several thousand men. Each regiment was allocated a fief (Gult), to ensure its upkeep ensured by the land revenue.

In 1445, following the Battle of Gomit, the chronicles record that Emperor Zara Yaqob started garrisoning the provinces with Chewa regiments.

Major divisions of the military were :
 Regiments at the court, under high court officials
 Regiments in the provinces, under regional Rases or other officials
 Regiments in border regions, or more autonomous provinces, such as Hadiya, Bahir Negash, Bale, under azmač who were military officials appointed by the king.

One of the Chewa regiments, known as the Abe Lahm in Geez, or the Weregenu, in Oromo, lasted, and participated to the Battle of Adwa, only to be phased out in the 1920s.

The modern army was created under Ras Tafari Makonnen, in 1917, with the formation of the Kebur Zabagna, the imperial guard.

Economy

The economy consisted of centuries old barter system with "primitive money" and currency of various kinds until 20th century in the framework of feudal system. Peasants worked to produce and fixated their activities to taxation, marketing infrastructure and agrarian production. 

In 1905, Menelik II established the first bank, Bank of Abyssinia  following concession from British occupied National Bank of Egypt in December 1904, that used to monopolize all government public funds, loans, print banknotes, mint coins and other privileges. It expanded branches to Harar, Dire Dawa, Gore and Dembidolo and agencies in Gambela and transit office in Djibouti. In 1932, it was renamed as "Bank of Ethiopia" following paid compensation by Emperor Haile Selassie. To promote industrial and manufacturing expansion, Haile Selassie, with assistance of National Economic Council, embarked development plan encompassing three Five-Years Master Plan from 1957 to 1974. Between 1960 and 1970, Ethiopia enjoyed an annual 4.4% growth rate in per capita and gross domestic product (GDP). There was an increase of manufacturing growth rate from 1.9% in 1960/61 to 4.4% in 1973/74, with wholesale, retail trade, transportation, and communication sectors increased from 9.5% to 15.6%.

Government

As feudalism became the central tenet in the Ethiopian Empire, it developed into an authoritarian system with institutionalized social inequality. As land became the prime commodity, its acquisition became the main driving force behind imperialism, especially from the reign of Menelik II onwards. 

As part of Emperor Haile Selassie's modernization efforts, the traditional monarchical regime was reformed through the introduction of the 1931 and 1955 constitutions, which introduced an unitary parliamentary system with two legislative bodies: the Chamber of Senate (Yeheggue Mewossegna Meker Beth) and Chamber of Deputies (Yeheggue Memeriya Meker Beth). Under the 1956 constitution Article 56, no one can be simultaneously a member of  both chambers, who meet at the beginning or ending of each session. 

In the parliamentary structure, the Chamber of Deputies consisted of 250 members elected every four years, whereas the Senate consisted of one-half of the Deputies (125) and were appointed by the Emperor in every six years.

See also

 Army of the Ethiopian Empire
 Crown Council of Ethiopia
 East African Campaign (World War II) (1941)
 Ethiopian Civil War (1974–1991)
 First Italo-Ethiopian War (1895–1896)
 History of Ethiopia
 Ethiopian historiography
 Italian East Africa (1936–1941)
 Italian guerrilla war in Ethiopia (1941–1943)
 List of Emperors of Ethiopia
 Second Italo-Ethiopian War (1935–1936)
 Sultanate of Ifat
 Sultanate of Showa
 Zemene Mesafint (1755–1855)

References

Bibliography

Further reading

External links

 
Wikipedia articles incorporating text from the World Factbook
History of Ethiopia
Countries in precolonial Africa
Christian states
2nd millennium in Ethiopia
1270 establishments
13th-century establishments in Africa
1974 disestablishments in Ethiopia
Former countries in Africa
Former monarchies
Former monarchies of Africa